Khatuna Skhirtladze (Georgian: ხათუნა სხირტლაძე born c. 1990) is a beauty pageant contestant who was crowned Miss Georgia 2008. She represented Georgia in Miss Leisure 2008 and in Miss Intercontinental 2008, where she placed in the top fifteen.  She competed in Miss World 2008.

References

External links
 Miss Georgia official website

Miss World 2008 delegates
1990s births
Living people
Beauty pageant winners from Georgia (country)
Models from Tbilisi
Female models from Georgia (country)